The  is a national expressway in Hyōgo Prefecture, Japan. It is owned and operated by West Nippon Expressway Company. It is signed as E29 under the Ministry of Land, Infrastructure, Transport and Tourism's "2016 Proposal for Realization of Expressway Numbering."

Naming
The expressway is officially referred to as the Chūgoku-Ōdan Expressway Himeji Tottori Route. The Chūgoku-Ōdan Expressway Himeji Tottori Route is the official designation for the Sanyō Expressway between Sanyō Himeji-Nishi Interchange and Harima Junction, the Harima Expressway between Harima Junction and Yamazaki Junction, the Chūgoku Expressway between Yamazaki Junction and Sayo Junction, and the Tottori Expressway between Sayo Junction and Tottori Interchange (concurrent with the Chūgoku-Ōdan Expressway Himeji Tottori Route).

Route description

The route is a two-lane expressway for its entire length, with some overtaking areas. The speed limit is 70 km/h.

History
The first section of the expressway was opened in 2003.

Future
The Harima Expressway is planned to be completed between its current northern terminus at Hyōgo Prefecture Route 726 and the Chūgoku Expressway in 2021. Upon completion, the total length of the expressway will be .

Junction list
The entire expressway is in Hyōgo Prefecture.

References

External links 
 West Nippon Expressway Company

Expressways in Japan
Roads in Hyōgo Prefecture
Harima Science Garden City